The men's 100 metres (T47) at the 2018 Commonwealth Games, as part of the athletics programme, took place at Carrara Stadium on 13 April 2018. The event was open to para-sport athletes competing under the T46 / T47 classifications.

Records
Prior to this competition, the existing world record was as follows:

Schedule
The schedule was as follows:

All times are Australian Eastern Standard Time (UTC+10)

Results
With six entrants, the event was held as a straight final.

Final

References

Men's 100 metres (T47)